Anna Christina "Titti" Rodling (born 19 December 1970 in Bräcke) is a Swedish former alpine skier who competed in the 1994 Winter Olympics. Chief operating officer of SLAO since 2016.

External links
 sports-reference.com

1970 births
Swedish female alpine skiers
Alpine skiers at the 1994 Winter Olympics
Olympic alpine skiers of Sweden
People from Bräcke Municipality
Living people
Sportspeople from Jämtland County
20th-century Swedish women